Kaszewiec  is a village in the administrative district of Gmina Różan, within Maków County, Masovian Voivodeship, in east-central Poland.

The village has a population of 53.

References

Kaszewiec